The green-breasted bushshrike or gladiator bushshrike (Malaconotus gladiator) is a species of bird in the family Malaconotidae. It is found in the Cameroonian Highlands forests.

Its natural habitats are subtropical or tropical moist montane forests and subtropical or tropical high-altitude grassland. It is threatened by habitat loss.

References

green-breasted bushshrike
Birds of Central Africa
green-breasted bushshrike
Taxonomy articles created by Polbot